Jovan Pačić (November 6, 1771, Baja - December 4, 1849  Budapest) was a Serbian painter and poet.

Jovan Pačić went to school in Kalocsa. In 1792 or 1793, he joined the army and fought against the French. In 1812 he suffered an injury when a sword cut through his mouth. He retired after a year of recuperation. As a retired cavalry captain, he moved to Novi Sad, and soon after settled in Győr in 1838. Jovan Pačić turned to painting and poetry in his leisure. He primarily painted landscapes and genre art. He was praised by his contemporaries.

References
 Jaša Ignjatović, Tri spisatelja Srpska (Danica, 1860)
 Vlad. Nikolić, Jovan Pačić (Brankovo Kolo, 1902)

Serbian painters
1771 births
1849 deaths
Serbian male poets
People from Baja, Hungary
Translators of Johann Wolfgang von Goethe